Wood is an annual small early summer  folk and roots music festival and environmental gathering, which takes place in Braziers Park, Ipsden near Wallingford, Oxfordshire, UK. Its independent organisers, Robin and Joe Bennett, also arrange the Truck Festival.

Events
There are two stages and the acts alternate between the two. The main stage is built of wood, and is solar-powered. The second stage (the Tree Tent) is in a medium-sized circus big-top and runs on bio-diesel. There is now a bicycle-powered disco as well. There are many workshops, including woodcraft, African drumming, jewellery making, thatching, poetry and singing.

Performers
The first Wood took place in 2008, and performers (primarily playing acoustic instruments) have included Brakes, Dodgy, Karine Polwart, Devon Sproule, King Creosote, Lightspeed Champion and Get Cape. Wear Cape. Fly  as well as many local musicians.

In 2010, the performers included Frank Turner, Peggy Sue, and The Unthanks.

In 2011, the performers included Sarabeth Tucek, Thea Gilmore, Eliza Carthy, Willy Mason, and Uiscedwr.

References

External links
 Wood Festival website
"Truck and Wood 2008" BBC Oxford 6 March 2008
 "Wood Festival - the tree-hugger's view" 22 May 2009 Tim Hughes, Oxford Mail
"Wood Festival" Arts Council England 1 May 2009
"Organisers get set for Wood eco-festival" 14 May 2009 Wallingford Herald
"Green festivals - All the best green festivals this summer" 8 May 2009 The Guardian
Wood photo group on flickr

Music festivals in Oxfordshire
Folk festivals in the United Kingdom
2008 establishments in England
Annual events in the United Kingdom
Music festivals established in 2008